T'way Air Co., Ltd., formerly Hansung Airlines, is a South Korean low-cost airline based in Seongsu-dong, Seongdong-gu, Seoul. In 2018, it is the third largest Korean low-cost carrier in the international market, carried 2.9 million domestic passengers and 4.2 million international passengers. Its international traffic has quadrupled over the past three years while domestic traffic has grown by only 12%.

History 
T'way Air began as Hansung Airlines (한성항공), which began flying between 2005 and 2008, after which the company reorganized and rebranded in 2010. The 't' in t'way stands for together, today and tomorrow.

The airline was established on 8 August 2010 with two Boeing 737-800s. The following month, the airline obtained an air operator's certificate (AOC) permitting domestic flights and commenced operations with services between Gimpo International Airport and Jeju International Airport. The following year an AOC for international operations was awarded and in October it launched the first international service, to Bangkok. In 2013 the airline achieved a profit for the first time. In November that year cargo services were launched. In March 2014, T'way Air introduced its seventh Boeing 737-800 aircraft. In April 2022, T'way Air received its first Airbus A330. In october 2022, T'Way announced it will serve the connection between Incheon and Sydney, which will be its first long-haul connection.

Destinations
, T'way Air currently serves or plans to serve the following destinations:

Fleet

, T'way Air operates the following aircraft:

Retired fleet

See also
List of low-cost airlines in South Korea

References

External links 
  
 

Airlines of South Korea
Airlines established in 2004
Airlines established in 2010
Companies based in Seoul
South Korean brands
Low-cost carriers
South Korean companies established in 2010
South Korean companies established in 2004